A sigil is a type of symbol used in magic. The term has usually referred to a  pictorial signature of a deity or spirit. In modern usage, especially in the context of chaos magic, sigil refers to a symbolic representation of the practitioner's desired outcome.

History

The use of symbols for magical or cultic purposes has been widespread since at least the Neolithic era. The term sigil derives from the Latin sigillum (pl. sigilla or sigils), meaning "seal." 

In medieval magic, the term sigil was commonly used to refer to occult signs which represented various angels and demons which the practitioner might summon. The magical training books called grimoires often listed pages of such sigils. A particularly well-known list is in The Lesser Key of Solomon, in which the sigils of the 72 princes of the hierarchy of hell are given for the magician's use. Such sigils are considered by some to be the equivalent of the true name of the spirit and thus granted the magician a measure of control over the beings.

A common method of creating the sigils of certain spirits was to use kameas, a special use case of magic squares — the names of the spirits were converted to numbers, which were then located on the magic square. The locations were then connected by lines, forming an abstract figure.

Austin Osman Spare

The artist and occultist Austin Osman Spare (1886–1956) developed his own unique method of creating and using sigils, which has had a huge effect on modern occultism. Spare didn't agree with Medieval practice of using these, arguing that such supernatural beings were simply complexes in the unconscious, and could be actively created through the process of sigilization.

Spare's technique became a cornerstone of chaos magic (see next section). It also influenced the artist Brion Gysin, who experimented with combining Spare's sigil method with the traditional form of magic squares:

Chaos magic

In chaos magic, following Spare, sigils are commonly created in a well ordered fashion by writing an intention, then condensing the letters of the statement down to form a sort of monogram. The chaos magician then uses the gnostic state to "launch" or "charge" the sigil – essentially bypassing the conscious mind to implant the desire in the unconscious. To quote Ray Sherwin:

After charging the sigil, it is considered necessary to repress all memory of it. In the words of Spare, there should be "a deliberate striving to forget it".

In modern chaos magic, when a complex of thoughts, desires, and intentions gains such a level of sophistication that it appears to operate autonomously from the magician's consciousness, as if it were an independent being, then such a complex is referred to as a servitor. When such a being becomes large enough that it exists independently of any one individual, as a form of "group mind", then it is referred to as an egregore.

Later chaos magicians have expanded on the basic sigilization technique. Grant Morrison coined the term hypersigil to refer to an extended work of art with magical meaning and willpower, created using adapted processes of sigilization. Their comic book series The Invisibles was intended as such a hypersigil. Morrison has also argued that modern corporate logos like "the McDonald's Golden Arches, the Nike swoosh and the Virgin autograph" are a form of viral sigil:

See also
 Apotropaic magic – Magic intended to repel evil
 Behenian fixed star – Fifteen stars with magical significance in medieval astrology
 Ceremonial magic – System of magical rituals drawing from many historical and modern sources
 Icelandic magical staves – Sigils found in ancient Icelandic grimoires
 List of sigils of demons
 Runic magic – Magic using runes or runestones
 Seal of Solomon – Purported magical signet ring of the biblical King Solomon
 Sigil of Baphomet – The official insignia of the Church of Satan
 Sigillum Dei – "Seal of God", dating to at least the Middle Ages; purported to give a skilled user the ability to control all living creatures except archangels
 Sympathetic magic – Set of magical beliefs and practices centered around the principles that like effects like and connections between objects remain, regardless of time or distance
 Veve – A magic and religious symbol in Voodoo representing a lwa

References

Citations

Works cited

Further reading

External links

Ceremonial magic
Chaos magic
Hermetic Qabalah
Hermeticism
Magic symbols
Practical Kabbalah